Elisabeth Withers is an American neo soul and R&B singer-songwriter.

Biography
Withers was born in Joliet, Illinois, and studied at the Berklee College of Music and then at New York University. She sang as a backup vocalist for Celine Dion and Jennifer Lopez, among others, and released several dance singles under the name Elle Patrice, including "Rising" and "Emotions". After hearing these singles, Nick Ashford asked her to audition for a Broadway production of The Color Purple, where she won the part of Shug Avery. Her performance earned her a Tony Award for Best Featured Actress in a Musical nomination at the 60th Tony Awards. As a neo soul singer, Withers signed with Blue Note Records in 2005. In 2007, she released a full-length album on Blue Note Records.

Discography
Studio albums
It Can Happen to Anyone (2007)
No Regrets (2010)

Singles
"Be With You" (2006) U.S. R&B No. 43
"Simple Things" (2007) U.S. R&B No. 53

References

External links 
 
 

1975 births
Singers from Illinois
Living people
People from Joliet, Illinois
Berklee College of Music alumni
New York University alumni
American neo soul singers
American contemporary R&B singers
21st-century American women singers
21st-century American singers
Theatre World Award winners